Tigist Girma (born 12 July 1993) is an Ethiopian athlete specialising in the marathon.

On May 1, 2021, Girma won the Ethiopian Olympic Marathon Trials in Sebeta City. She has twice run 2:19, with 2:19:52 being her personal best from the Amsterdam Marathon in 2019 and then second, almost matching it, in December 2020 with a time at the Valencia Marathon of 2:19:56. She also finished in the top 10 at the 2020 Tokyo Marathon and the 2021 London Marathon.

References

1993 births
Living people
Ethiopian female long-distance runners
Ethiopian female marathon runners
20th-century Ethiopian women
21st-century Ethiopian women